Malith Jayathilake is a Sri Lankan politician and a Member of Parliament. He was appointed  to Parliament as a national list member in 2015.

References

Members of the 15th Parliament of Sri Lanka
Sinhalese politicians
1972 births
Living people